Gustavo Pinedo Zabala (born February 18, 1988 in Coripata) is a Bolivian footballer, who is currently playing for Club Aurora.

Club career
Pinedo is a Bolivian national. He began his football career playing abroad for Spanish club Cádiz CF B in the reserve squad, however he only accumulated 10 appearances with the club. In 2007 a had a brief stint in the Segunda División with Xerez CD. Consequently, he was loaned to CD Rota and later to Ukrainian first division club Chornomorets Odesa, but Pinedo was unable to meet the expectations. During the second semester of 2010, he returned to Bolivia and signed with Blooming, which became the first native club in his career. The year Pinedo spent at Blooming can be described as poor as he made sporadic appearances mostly coming off the bench. In mid 2011 he transferred to Real Mamoré, but remained primarily in a backup role.

International career
Pinedo made his debut for the Bolivia national team in an friendly against South Africa on 28 March 2007.

References

External links
 
 
 
 

1988 births
Afro-Bolivian people
Living people
People from Nor Yungas Province
Association football wingers
Bolivian footballers
Bolivia international footballers
Cádiz CF B players
Xerez CD footballers
FC Chornomorets Odesa players
Club Blooming players
Municipal Real Mamoré players
La Paz F.C. players
Universitario de Sucre footballers
San Martín de San Juan footballers
Bolivian expatriate footballers
Expatriate footballers in Argentina
Expatriate footballers in Ukraine
Ukrainian Premier League players
Footballers at the 2007 Pan American Games
Pan American Games competitors for Bolivia